Vampire Weekend is an American indie rock band from New York City. The band has released four studio albums: Vampire Weekend in 2008, Contra in 2010, and Modern Vampires of the City in 2013 under XL Recordings, and Father of the Bride in 2019 under Columbia Records.

American Music Awards
The American Music Awards are given out for outstanding achievements in the record industry. Vampire Weekend have been nominated once.

|-
|  || Vampire Weekend || Favorite Alternative Artist ||

Billboard Music Awards
The Billboard Music Awards are honors given out annually by Billboard, a publication covering the music business and a music popularity chart. Vampire Weekend have been nominated on one occasion.

|-
| 2020 || Father of the Bride || Top Rock Album ||

BRIT Awards
The BRIT Awards are the British Phonographic Industry's annual pop music awards. Vampire Weekend have received one nomination.

|-
|  || Vampire Weekend || Best International Group ||

Grammy Awards
The Grammy Awards are awarded annually by the National Academy of Recording Arts and Sciences of the United States since 1958. Vampire Weekend have been nominated five times and have won twice.

|-
|  || Contra || rowspan=2|Best Alternative Music Album || 
|-
|  || Modern Vampires of the City || 
|-
| rowspan=3|  || rowspan=2|Father of the Bride || Album of the Year || 
|-
| Best Alternative Music Album || 
|-
| "Harmony Hall" || Best Rock Song || 
|-

International Dance Music Awards
The International Dance Music Awards are an annual electronic and dance music awards held by the Winter Music Conference. Vampire Weekend have received one nomination.

|-
| 2011 || "Giving Up the Gun" || Best Alternative/Rock Dance Track ||

MTV Europe Music Awards
The MTV Europe Music Awards (EMA) were established in 1994 by MTV Networks Europe to celebrate the most popular music videos in Europe. Vampire Weekend have received a nomination on one occasion.

|-
| 2011 || Vampire Weekend || Best Alternative ||

MTV Video Music Awards
The MTV Video Music Awards (VMAs) were established in 1984 by MTV to celebrate the most popular music videos in Europe. Vampire Weekend have been nominated once.

|-
| 2013 || "Diane Young" || Best Rock Video ||

mtvU Woodie Awards
The MtvU Woodie Awards are a music awards show held by mtvU to recognize "the music voted best by college students". Vampire Weekend have received two nominations.

|-
| 2008 || "Cape Cod Kwassa Kwassa" || Best Video || 
|-
| 2011 || "Giving Up the Gun" || Best Video||

NME Awards
The NME Awards are an annual music awards show, founded by the music magazine NME. Vampire Weekend have won one award.

|-
| 2008 || Vampire Weekend || Best New American Alternative/Indie Band ||

Q Awards
The Q Awards are the UK's annual music awards run by the music magazine Q. Vampire Weekend have won two awards and have been nominated another four times.

|-
|rowspan="3"| 2008 || Vampire Weekend || Best New Act || 
|-
| Vampire Weekend || Best Album || 
|-
| "A-Punk" || Best Video || 
|-
| 2011 || "Giving Up the Gun" || Best Video || 
|-
| 2013 || Vampire Weekend || Best Act In The World Today || 
|-
| 2019 || "Harmony Hall" || Best Track ||

References

Vampire Weekend